Miss International 1979, the 19th Miss International pageant, was held on November 12, 1979 at the Mielparque in Tokyo, Japan. The then–15-year-old Mimilanie "Melanie" Marquez earned Philippines' third Miss International crown, becoming the youngest Miss International in history.

Results

Placements

Contestants

  - Ana Maria Soliman Iribarne
  - Regina Reid
  - Elisabeth Schmidt
  - Françoise Helene Julia Moens
  - Sonia Beatriz Villarroel
  - Suzane Ferreira de Andrade
  - Beverly Isherwood
  - Karen Vanderwoude
  - Paulina Quiroga
  - Ivonne Margarita Guerra de la Espriella
  - Maria Lorena Acuña Karpinski
  - Eva Bjerre Johanssen
  - Kate Elizabeth Nyberg
  - Martine Juliette David
  - Claudia Katharina Herzog
  - Despina Triantafyllidou
  - Vivian Elaine Indalecio
  - Zoe Ann Roach
  - Mary Maria Johanna Adriana Kruyssen
  - Lilian Anibeth Rivera
  - Maria Chung Wai-Ping
  - Sigrun Bjork Sverrisdóttir
  - Neeta Pravin Painter
  - Lorraine Marion O'Conner
  - Rachel "Helly" Ben-David
  - Nives Bordignon
  - Hideko Haba
  - Kim Jin-sun
  - Carmen Sue Asciak
  - Marcela Díaz Portilla
  -Maria Elena Amador Valerio
  - Unni Margrethe Öglaend
  - Melanie Marquez
  - Maria Luisa da Silva
  - Annie Tan Chen Chiau Chuin
  - Yolanda Maria Hoyos Vega
  - Anna Angela Bratt
  - Phattamavadee Ann Thanaputti
  - Serra Sengül
  - Nidia Silvera
  - Anna Maria Rapagna
  - Nilsa Josefina Moronta Sangronis
  - Manuela Mitic

Withdrawals
  - Nancie Foo---she collapsed on the finals night
  - Gaby Bosshard (Europe '78)

Notes

1979
1979 in Tokyo
1979 beauty pageants
Beauty pageants in Japan